Norbert Domnik (born 30 July 1964) is an athlete from Austria, who competes in triathlon.

Domnik competed at the second Olympic triathlon at the 2004 Summer Olympics.  He placed thirty-seventh with a total time of 1:59:13.25.

References

1964 births
Austrian male triathletes
Living people
Triathletes at the 2004 Summer Olympics
Olympic triathletes of Austria
Duathletes